Hell Yeah is the twentieth album by industrial band KMFDM. It was released on earMUSIC and KMFDM Records on August 18, 2017.

Track listing

Personnel 
All information from CD booklet.
 Sascha Konietzko – bass (1–9, 11–13), drums (1–5, 7, 9–13), synths (1–13), vocals (1–2, 4–13)
 Lucia Cifarelli – vocals (2, 5, 6, 8–10, 12)
 Andy Selway – toms (1), drums (2, 4, 6, 8–9, 11–13)

Guest musicians 
 Anabella Asia – spoken word (1), synth solo (10)
 Gared Dirge – Hammond B3 (6)
 Chris Harms – guitars (1–2, 4, 6–13), vocals (4, 13)
 Mika Harms – spoken word (1)
 Jules Hodgson – guitars (1)
 Abby Martin – spoken word (3)
 Doug Wimbish – bass (10)
 Sin Quirin – guitars (13)

Charts

References 

2017 albums
KMFDM albums
Edel AG albums
Albums produced by Sascha Konietzko